Dr. Scott David Haltzman (born 1960 in Allentown, Pennsylvania) is an American psychiatrist, relationship counselor, and author.  He is known for his work in support of marriage and husbands.

Haltzman is the author of The Secrets of Happily Married Men: Eight Ways to Win Your Wife's Heart Forever (2006), The Secrets of Happily Married Women: How to Get More Out of Your Relationship by Doing Less (2008), The Secrets of Happy Families: Eight Keys to Building a Lifetime of Connection and Contentment (2009), and The Secrets of Surviving Infidelity (2013).

Haltzman’s interest in the nature of the married relationship grows from observations made over years of his providing individual and couple’s therapy.  His research focuses on seeking out data to better help understand the relationship patterns of husbands and wives, and the techniques individuals use to advance the institution of marriage.

Early life and education

Haltzman is the son of Jay Haltzman, the President of the Paint-n-Paper stores in Allentown, Pennsylvania, and the late Delores ("Dolly") Haltzman, the former President and Artistic Director of the Repertory Dance Theater and the Dolly Haltzman School of Dance in Allentown.  He has two brothers (Mark, a trial attorney, and Jonathan) and a sister (Jennifer, the current President of the Repertory Dance Theater and Dolly Haltzman School of Dance).  Haltzman's inquisitive mind was in evidence at an early age.

Haltzman graduated from Emmaus High School in Emmaus, Pennsylvania and received his bachelor's degree in English and Biology from Brown University in 1982.  He received his M.D. degree from Brown Medical School in 1985.  He completed his chief residency and was a Fellow in Psychiatry at the Yale New Haven Hospital.

Haltzman is board certified in psychiatry, and is a Distinguished Fellow of the American Psychiatric Association.

Career
Haltzman is the Medical Director of Northern Rhode Island Community Services, a mental health and substance-abuse treatment center in Woonsocket, Rhode Island, and a Clinical Assistant Professor of Psychiatry & Human Behavior at Brown Medical School.  He also has an active private practice, with a focus on marriage counseling for individuals and couples.  In addition, he is a presenter at the annual Smart Marriages Conference. Haltzman also spends one day of his week working with clients for SSTAR, a Drug and Alcohol / Mental Health Facility in Fall River, Massachusetts.

Author

Haltzman is the author of The Secrets of Happily Married Men: Eight Ways to Win Your Wife's Heart Forever (2006), which discusses strategies to help men improve their marriages. On Valentine's Day 2006, columnist John Tierney wrote a New York Times editorial echoing advice from Haltzman's book. After Tierney's editorial, The Secrets of Happily Married Men rose to Amazon.com's list of top 100 sellers in books. The book was also chosen by Time Magazine as one of the "Six Books for a Better You in 2006."

In January 2008 Haltzman released The Secrets of Happily Married Women: How to Get More Out of Your Relationship by Doing Less, which he co-authored with Theresa Foy DiGeronimo.

Haltzman followed that with the July 2009 release of The Secrets of Happy Families: Eight Keys to Building a Lifetime of Connection and Contentment, Jossey-Bass/John Wiley & Sons. Using the format of his prior two books, Haltzman published the findings of a survey of 1,266 individuals and determined the factors that led to families being happy. Library Journal'''s review stated: "An authoritative book on a timely subject for mental-health professionals and parents looking to strengthen familial bonds."

He is also the author of The Secrets of Surviving Infidelity, Johns Hopkins University Press, 2013. Publishers Weekly, in reviewing it, wrote: "This vital guide from marriage and infidelity expert Haltzman ... contains cogent advice for anyone in a troubled relationship."

Haltzman founded the websites www.secretsofmarriedmen.com and www.365Reasons.com.

Media appearances
Haltzman has appeared on the Today Show, Good Morning America, 20/20, and Tucker, and has been cited in media on a number of occasions.

Awards
In 2007, Haltzman was honored by the Women's Resource Center of Newport & Bristol Counties (Rhode Island) as one of 19 "Men who Make a Difference."

Personal
Haltzman married Susan (née Reynolds Hayum) Haltzman in 1988. They reside in Providence, Rhode Island. His son, Matthew, owns a Super Lawyers rated law firm in Fort Collins, Colorado where Haltzman serves as a medical consultant.

References

External links
Redbook Magazine bio
"Dr. Scott's 365 Reasons to Stay Married", 365reasons.com.
"Susan Reynolds Hayum Weds Dr. Scott Haltzman," The New York Times, March 20, 1988.
"How to win your wife’s heart forever", by Scott Haltzman, FamilyMinistries.org, January 2005.
"Making Marriage (Like) Work; An Author Says Men Can Succeed by Treating It Like a Job," The Washington Post, January 24, 2006.
"Med School prof speaks out on relationships; Book by Scott Haltzman '82 MD '85 garners media attention", The Brown Daily Herald'', February 2, 2006.

1960 births
Living people
American psychiatrists
American self-help writers
Emmaus High School alumni
Jewish American writers
Brown University alumni
Men's movement in the United States
People from Naples, Florida
Writers from Allentown, Pennsylvania
Alpert Medical School alumni
21st-century American Jews